Route nationale 11 (RN 11) is a secondary highway in Madagascar of 204 km, running from Mahanoro to Mananjary. It crosses the regions of Atsinanana and Vatovavy.

Selected locations on route
(north to south)
RN 11a from  Mahanoro 
Nosy Varika - 204 km
Tsiatosika - intersection with RN 24
Betampona
intersection with RN 25
Mananjary

See also
List of roads in Madagascar
Transport in Madagascar

References

Roads in Atsinanana
Roads in Vatovavy
Roads in Madagascar

de:Route nationale 11a (Madagaskar)